2nd Field Artillery Regiment can refer to:
2nd Field Artillery Regiment (Belgium), now known as "Para-Commando Field Artillery Battery"
2nd Field Artillery Regiment (Canada)
2nd Field Artillery Regiment (United States)